The Best of The Rippingtons is a compilation album by the American jazz group The Rippingtons, released in 1997 by the GRP label. The album is a retrospective of their previous GRP albums, and also includes two previously unreleased tracks.

The album reached No. 10 on the Billboard Contemporary Jazz chart.

Track listing
All songs written by Russ Freeman
"Garden of Babylon" - 5:40 (previously unreleased)
"Tourist in Paradise" - 5:41 (from Tourist in Paradise)
"Affair in San Miguel" - 5:08 (from Welcome to the St. James' Club)
"Snowbound" - 4:53 (from Curves Ahead)
"Aruba!" - 4:17 (from Tourist in Paradise)
"Sapphire Island" - 4:48 (previously unreleased)
"Principles of Desire" - 4:42 (from Sahara)
"Vienna" - 4:51 (from Weekend in Monaco)
"Kenya" - 5:22 (from Welcome to the St. James' Club)
"She Likes to Watch" - 5:31 (from Moonlighting)
"Urban Wanderer" - 4:43 (from Brave New World)
"Kilimanjaro" - 4:48 (from Kilimanjaro)

Personnel
Russ Freeman - guitar, synthesizers, keyboards
Jeff Kashiwa - saxophone
Steve Reid - percussion
Brandon Fields - saxophone
Kenny G - saxophone
Gregg Karukas - keyboards
Kim Stone - bass
Steve Bailey - bass
Tony Morales - drums
Patti Austin - vocals
Carl Anderson - vocals
Bill Lanphier - bass
Eric Marienthal - saxophone
Kirk Whalum - saxophone
Mark Portmann - piano

Charts

References

External links
The Best of The Rippingtons at Discogs
The Best of The Rippingtons at AllMusic
The Rippingtons Official Website

1997 compilation albums
The Rippingtons albums
Windham Hill Records albums